The Isle of Wight (/waɪt/ WYTE) is an island in the English Channel, two to five miles (3.2 to 8.0 km) off the coast of Hampshire, across the Solent. It is the largest and second-most populous island in England. Referred to as 'The Island' by residents, the Isle of Wight has resorts that have been popular holiday destinations since Victorian times. It is known for its mild climate, coastal scenery, and verdant landscape of fields, downland, and chines. The island is historically part of Hampshire and is designated a UNESCO Biosphere Reserve.

The island has been home to the poets Algernon Charles Swinburne and Alfred, Lord Tennyson. Queen Victoria built her summer residence and final home, Osborne House at East Cowes on the Isle. It has a maritime and industrial tradition of boat-building, sail-making, the manufacture of flying boats, hovercraft, and Britain's space rockets. The island hosts annual music festivals, including the Isle of Wight Festival, which in 1970 was the largest rock music event ever held. It has well-conserved wildlife and some of Europe's richest cliffs and quarries of dinosaur fossils.

The island has played an essential part in the defence of the ports of Southampton and Portsmouth and has been near the front line of conflicts through the ages, having faced the Spanish Armada and weathered the Battle of Britain. Being rural for most of its history, its Victorian fashionability and the growing affordability of holidays led to significant urban development during the late 19th and early 20th centuries.

The island became a separate administrative county in 1890, independent of Hampshire. It continued to share the Lord Lieutenant of Hampshire until 1974, when it was made a ceremonial county in its own right. The island no longer has administrative links to Hampshire. However, the two counties share their police force and fire and rescue service, and the island's Anglican churches belong to the Diocese of Portsmouth (originally Winchester). A combined local authority with Portsmouth and Southampton was considered but was unlikely to proceed as of 2017.

The quickest public transport link to the mainland is the hovercraft (Hovertravel) from Ryde to Southsea. Three vehicle ferries and two catamaran services cross the Solent to Southampton, Lymington, and Portsmouth via the island's largest ferry operator, Wightlink, and the island's second-largest ferry company, Red Funnel. Tourism is the largest industry on the island.

Name
The oldest records that give a name for the Isle of Wight are from the Roman Empire. It was called Vectis or Vecta in Latin and Iktis or Ouiktis in Greek. Latin Vecta, Old English Wiht, and Old Welsh Gueid and Guith were recorded from the Anglo-Saxon period. The Domesday Book called the island Wit. The modern Welsh name is Ynys Wyth (ynys meaning island). These are all variants of the same name, possibly Celtic in origin.

Inhabitants of the Isle of Wight were known as Wihtware.

Toponym 

 Place of the division 
 The island that lifts up out of the sea.

History

Pre-Bronze Age
During the Pleistocene glacial periods, sea levels were lower, and the present-day Solent was part of the valley of the Solent River. The river flowed eastward from Dorset, following the course of the modern Solent strait, before travelling south and southwest towards the major Channel River system. At these times, extensive gravel terraces associated with the Solent River and the forerunners of the island's modern rivers were deposited. During warmer interglacial periods, silts, beach gravels, clays, and muds of marine and estuarine origin were deposited due to higher sea levels, similar to those experienced today.

The earliest clear evidence of Lower Palaeolithic archaic human occupation on what is now the Isle of Wight is found close to Priory Bay. More than 300 acheulean handaxes have been recovered from the beach and cliff slopes, originating from a sequence of Pleistocene gravels dating approximately to MIS 11-MIS 9 (424,000–374,000 years ago). Reworked and abraded artefacts found at the site may be considerably older, however, closer to 500,000 years old. The identity of the hominids who produced these tools is unknown. However, sites and fossils of the same age range in Europe are often attributed to Homo heidelbergensis or early populations of Neanderthals.

A Middle Palaeolithic Mousterian flint assemblage, consisting of 50 handaxes and debitage, has been recovered from Great Pan Farm in the Medina Valley near Newport. Gravel sequences at the site have been dated to the MIS 3 interstadial during the last glacial period (c. 50,000 years ago). These tools are associated with the late Neanderthal occupation, and evidence of late Neanderthal presence is seen across Britain at this time.

No significant evidence of Upper Palaeolithic activity exists on the Isle of Wight. This period is associated with the expansion and establishment of populations of modern human (Homo sapiens) hunter-gatherers in Europe, beginning around 45,000 years ago. However, evidence of late Upper Palaeolithic activity has been found at nearby sites on the mainland, notably Hengistbury Head in Dorset, dating to just before the onset of the Holocene and the end of the last glacial period. 
A submerged escarpment 11m below sea level off Bouldnor Cliff on the island's northwest coastline is home to an internationally significant mesolithic archaeological site. The site has yielded evidence of seasonal occupation by Mesolithic hunter-gatherers dating to c. 6050 BC. Finds include flint tools, burnt flint, worked timbers, wooden platforms, and pits. The worked wood shows evidence of splitting large planks from oak trunks, interpreted as being intended for use as dug-out canoes. DNA analysis of sediments at the site yielded wheat DNA, not found in Britain until the Neolithic 2,000 years after the occupation at Bouldnor Cliff. It has been suggested this is evidence of wide-reaching trade in Mesolithic Europe; however, the contemporaneity of the wheat with the Mesolithic occupation has been contested. When hunter-gatherers used the site, it was located on a river bank surrounded by wetlands and woodland As sea levels rose throughout the Holocene, the river valley slowly flooded, submerging the site.

Evidence of Mesolithic occupation on the island is generally found along the river valleys, particularly along the north of the island and in the former catchment of the western Yar. Other key sites are found at Newtown Creek, Werrar, and Wootton-Quarr.

Flint tools and monuments attest to neolithic occupation on the Isle of Wight. Unlike the previous Mesolithic hunter-gatherer population, Neolithic communities on the Isle of Wight were based on farming and linked to a migration of Neolithic populations from France and northwest Europe to Britain c. 6,000 years ago.

The Isle of Wight's most visible Neolithic site is the Longstone at Mottistone, the remains of an early Neolithic long barrow. Constructed initially with two standing stones at the entrance, only one remains today. A Neolithic mortuary enclosure has been identified on Tennyson Down near Freshwater.

Bronze and Iron Age

Bronze Age Britain had large tin reserves in Cornwall and Devon areas, which was necessary to smelt bronze. At that time, the sea level was much lower, and carts of tin were brought across the Solent at low tide for export, possibly on the Ferriby Boats. Anthony Snodgrass suggests that a shortage of tin, as a part of the Bronze Age Collapse and trade disruptions in the Mediterranean around 1300 BC, forced metalworkers to seek an alternative to bronze. From the 7th century BC, during the Late Iron Age, the Isle of Wight, like the rest of Great Britain, was occupied by the Celtic Britons, in the form of the Durotriges tribe, as attested by finds of their coins, for example, the South Wight Hoard, and the Shalfleet Hoard. The island was known as Ynys Weith in Brittonic Celtic. Southeastern Britain experienced significant immigration, which is reflected in the current residents' genetic makeup. As the Iron Age began, tin value likely dropped sharply, greatly changing the Isle of Wight's economy. Trade, however, continued, as evidenced by the local abundance of European Iron Age coins.

Roman period
Julius Caesar reported that the Belgae took the Isle of Wight in about 85 BC and recognised the culture of this general region as "Belgic" but made no reference to Vectis. The Roman historian Suetonius mentions that the island was captured by the commander Vespasian. The Romans built no towns on the island, but the remains of at least seven Roman villas have been found, indicating the prosperity of local agriculture. First-century exports were principally hides, enslaved people, hunting dogs, grain, cattle, silver, gold, and iron.

Early Medieval period

There are indications that the island had vast trading links, with a port at Bouldnor, evidence of Bronze Age tin trading, and finds of Late Iron Age coins. Starting in AD 449, the 5th and 6th centuries saw groups of Germanic-speaking peoples from Northern Europe crossing the English Channel and gradually set about conquering the region.

During the Early Middle Ages, the island was settled by Jutes as the pagan kingdom of the Wihtwara under King Arwald.  In 685, it was invaded by King Cædwalla of Wessex, who tried to replace the inhabitants with his followers. Though in 686, Arwald was defeated, and the island became the last part of English lands to be converted to Christianity, Cædwalla was unsuccessful in driving the Jutes from the island. Wight was added to Wessex and became part of England under King Alfred the Great, including within the shire of Hampshire.

It suffered especially from Viking raids and was often used as a winter base by Viking raiders when they could not reach Normandy. Later, both Earl Tostig and his brother Harold Godwinson (who became King Harold II) held manors on the island.

Norman Conquest – 11th century

The Norman Conquest of 1066 created the position of Lord of the Isle of Wight; the island was given by William the Conqueror to his kinsman William FitzOsbern. Carisbrooke Priory and the fort of Carisbrooke Castle were then founded. Allegiance was sworn to FitzOsbern rather than the king; the Lordship was subsequently granted to the de Redvers family by Henry I after his succession in 1100.

For nearly 200 years the island was a semi-independent feudal fiefdom, with the de Redvers family ruling from Carisbrooke. The final private owner was the Countess Isabella de Fortibus, who, on her deathbed in 1293, was persuaded to sell it to Edward I. Subsequently, the island was under the control of the English Crown and its Lordship a royal appointment.

The island continued to be attacked from the continent: it was raided in 1374 by the fleet of Castile and in 1377 by French raiders who burned several towns, including Newtown.

Under Henry VIII, who developed the Royal Navy and its Portsmouth base, the island was fortified at Yarmouth, Cowes, East Cowes, and Sandown.

The French invasion on 21 July 1545 (famous for the sinking of the Mary Rose on the 19th) was repulsed by local militia.

During the English Civil War, King Charles I fled to the Isle of Wight, believing he would receive sympathy from  Governor Robert Hammond. Still, Hammond imprisoned the king in Carisbrooke Castle.

During the Seven Years' War, the island was a staging post for British troops departing on expeditions against the French coast, such as the Raid on Rochefort. During 1759, with a planned French invasion imminent, a large force of soldiers was stationed there. The French called off their invasion following the Battle of Quiberon Bay.

19th century – present

In the mid-1840s, potato blight was first found ​in the UK on the island, having arrived from Belgium. It was later transmitted to Ireland.

In the 1860s, what remains in real terms the most expensive ever government spending project saw fortifications built on the island and in the Solent, as well as elsewhere along the south coast, including the Palmerston Forts, The Needles Batteries, and Fort Victoria, because of fears about possible French invasion.

The future Queen Victoria spent childhood holidays on the island and became fond of it. When she became queen, she made Osborne House her winter home. Subsequently, the island became a fashionable holiday resort​ for many, including Alfred, Lord Tennyson, Julia Margaret Cameron, and Charles Dickens (who wrote much of David Copperfield there), as well as the French painter Berthe Morisot and members of European royalty.

Until the queen's example, the island had been rural, with most people employed in farming, fishing, or boat-building. The boom in tourism, spurred by growing wealth and leisure time and by Victoria's presence, led to the significant urban development of the island's coastal resorts. As one report summarizes, "The Queen's regular presence on the island helped put the Isle of Wight 'on the map' as a Victorian holiday and wellness destination ... and her former residence Osborne House is now one of the most visited attractions on the island." While on the island, the queen used a bathing machine that could be wheeled into the water on Osborne Beach; inside the small wooden hut, she could undress and then bathe, without being visible to others. Her machine had a changing room and a WC with plumbing. The refurbished machine is now displayed at the beach.

On 14 January 1878, Alexander Graham Bell demonstrated an early version of the telephone to the queen, placing calls to Cowes, Southampton, and London. These were the first publicly-witnessed long-distance telephone calls in the UK. The queen tried the device and considered the process to be "quite extraordinary" although the sound was "rather faint". She later asked to buy the equipment that was used, but Bell offered to make "a set of telephones" specifically for her.

The world's first radio station was set up by Guglielmo Marconi in 1897, during her reign, at the Needles Battery, at the western tip of the island. That location is now the site of the Marconi Monument. In 1898 the first paid wireless telegram (called a "Marconigram") was sent from this station, and the island was for some time the home of the National Wireless Museum near Ryde.

Queen Victoria died at Osborne House on 22 January 1901 at 81.

During the Second World War, the island was frequently bombed. With its proximity to German-occupied France, the island hosted observation stations, transmitters, and the RAF radar station at Ventnor. It was the starting point for one of the earlier Operation Pluto pipelines to feed fuel to Europe after the Normandy landings.

The Needles Battery was used to develop and test the Black Arrow and Black Knight space rockets, which were subsequently launched from Woomera, Australia.

The Isle of Wight Festival was a ​large rock festival near Afton Down, West Wight, in August 1970, following two smaller concerts in 1968 and 1969. The 1970 show was one of the last public performances by Jimi Hendrix and attracted somewhere between 600,000 and 700,000 attendees. The festival was revived in 2002 in a different format and is now an annual event.

On 26 October 2020, an oil tanker, the Nave Andromeda, suspected to have been hijacked by Nigerian stowaways, was stormed southeast of the island by the Special Boat Service. Seven people believed to be Nigerians seeking UK asylum were handed over to Hampshire Police.

Governance 

The island has a single Member of Parliament. The Isle of Wight constituency covers the entire island, with 138,300 permanent residents in 2011, being one of the most populated constituencies in the United Kingdom (more than 50% above the English average). In 2011 following passage of the Parliamentary Voting System and Constituencies Act, the Sixth Periodic Review of Westminster constituencies was to have changed this, but this was deferred to no earlier than October 2022 by the Electoral Registration and Administration Act 2013.  Thus the single constituency remained for the 2015, 2017 and 2019 general elections. However, two separate East and West constituencies are proposed for the island under the 2022 review now under way.

The Isle of Wight is a ceremonial and non-metropolitan county. Since the abolition of its two borough councils and restructuring of the Isle of Wight County Council into the new Isle of Wight Council in 1995, it has been administered by a single unitary authority.

Elections in the constituency have traditionally been a battle between the Conservatives and the Liberal Democrats. Andrew Turner of the Conservative Party gained the seat from Peter Brand of the Lib Dems at the 2001 general election. Since 2009, Turner was embroiled in controversy over his expenses, health, and relationships with colleagues, with local Conservatives having tried but failed to remove him in the runup to the 2015 general election.  He stood down prior to the 2017 snap general election, and the new Conservative Party candidate Bob Seely was elected with a majority of 21,069 votes.

At the Isle of Wight Council election of 2013, the Conservatives lost the majority which they had held since 2005 to the Island Independents, with Island Independent councillors holding 16 of the 40 seats, and a further five councillors sitting as independents outside the group. The Conservatives regained control, winning 10 more seats and taking their total to 25 at the 2017 local election, before losing 7 seats in 2021. A coalition entitled the Alliance Coalition was formed between independent, Green Party and Our Island councillors, with independent councillor Lora Peacey-Wilcox leading the council since May 2021.

There have been small regionalist movements: the Vectis National Party and the Isle of Wight Party; but they have attracted little support at elections.

Geography 

Slightly more than half, mainly in the west, is designated as the Isle of Wight Area of Outstanding Natural Beauty. Its landscapes are diverse, leading to its oft-quoted description as "England in miniature". In June 2019 the whole island was designated a UNESCO Biosphere Reserve, recognising the sustainable relationships between its residents and the local environment.

West Wight is predominantly rural, with dramatic coastlines dominated by the chalk downland ridge, running across the whole island and ending in the Needles stacks. The southwestern quarter is commonly referred to as the Back of the Wight, and has a unique character. The most notable habitats on the rest of the island are probably the soft cliffs and sea ledges, which are scenic features, important for wildlife, and internationally protected.

The island has three principal rivers. The River Medina flows north into the Solent, the Eastern Yar flows roughly northeast to Bembridge Harbour, and the Western Yar flows the short distance from Freshwater Bay to a relatively large estuary at Yarmouth.  Without human intervention the sea might well have split the island into three: at the west end where a bank of pebbles separates Freshwater Bay from the marshy backwaters of the Western Yar east of Freshwater, and at the east end where a thin strip of land separates Sandown Bay from the marshy Eastern Yar basin.

The Undercliff between St Catherine's Point and Bonchurch is the largest area of landslip morphology in western Europe.

The north coast is unusual in having four high tides each day, with a double high tide every twelve and a half hours.  This arises because the western Solent is narrower than the eastern; the initial tide of water flowing from the west starts to ebb before the stronger flow around the south of the island returns through the eastern Solent to create a second high water.

Geology

The Isle of Wight is made up of a variety of rock types dating from early Cretaceous (around 127 million years ago) to the middle of the Palaeogene (around 30 million years ago). The geological structure is dominated by a large monocline which causes a marked change in age of strata from the northern younger Tertiary beds to the older Cretaceous beds of the south. This gives rise to a dip of almost 90 degrees in the chalk beds, seen best at the Needles.

The northern half of the island is mainly composed of clays, with the southern half formed of the chalk of the central east–west downs, as well as Upper and Lower Greensands and Wealden strata. These strata continue west from the island across the Solent into Dorset, forming the basin of Poole Harbour (Tertiary) and the Isle of Purbeck (Cretaceous) respectively. The chalky ridges of Wight and Purbeck were a single formation before they were breached by waters from the River Frome during the last ice age, forming the Solent and turning Wight into an island. The Needles, along with Old Harry Rocks on Purbeck, represent the edges of this breach.

All the rocks found on the island are sedimentary, such as limestones, mudstones and sandstones. They are rich in fossils; many can be seen exposed on beaches as the cliffs erode. Lignitic coal is present in small quantities within seams, and can be seen on the cliffs and shore at Whitecliff Bay. Fossilised molluscs have been found there, and also on the northern coast along with fossilised crocodiles, turtles and mammal bones; the youngest date back to around 30 million years ago.

The island is one of the most important areas in Europe for dinosaur fossils. The eroding cliffs often reveal previously hidden remains, particularly along the Back of the Wight. Dinosaur bones and fossilised footprints can be seen in and on the rocks exposed around the island's beaches, especially at Yaverland and Compton Bay, from the strata of the Wessex Formation. As a result, the island has been nicknamed "Dinosaur Island" and Dinosaur Isle was established in 2001.

The area was affected by sea level changes during the repeated Quaternary glaciations. The island probably became separated from the mainland about 125,000 years ago, during the Ipswichian interglacial.

Climate
Like the rest of the UK, the island has an oceanic climate, but is somewhat milder and sunnier, which makes it a holiday destination. It also has a longer growing season. Lower Ventnor and the neighbouring Undercliff have a particular microclimate, because of their sheltered position south of the downs. The island enjoys 1,800–2,100 hours of sunshine a year. Some years have almost no snow in winter, and only a few days of hard frost. The island is in Hardiness zone 9.

Flora and fauna
The Isle of Wight is one of the few places in England where the red squirrel is still flourishing; no grey squirrels are to be found. There are occasional sightings of wild deer, and there is a colony of wild goats on Ventnor's downs. Protected species such as the dormouse and rare bats can be found. The island is home to a population of European hedgehogs, and a rescue organisation devoted to them, Save Our Hedgehogs Isle of Wight, was founded in 2019. The Glanville fritillary butterfly's distribution in the United Kingdom is largely restricted to the edges of the island's crumbling cliffs.

A competition in 2002 named the pyramidal orchid as the Isle of Wight's county flower.

Settlements

 Newport is the centrally located county town, with a population of about 25,000 and the island's main shopping area. Located next to the River Medina, Newport Quay was a busy port until the mid-19th century.
 Ryde, the largest town with a population of about 30,000, is in the northeast. It is Victorian with the oldest seaside pier in England and miles of sandy and pebble beaches.
 Cowes hosts the annual Cowes Week and is an international sailing centre. 
 East Cowes is famous for Osborne House, Norris Castle and as the home from 1929 to 1964 of Saunders-Roe, the historic aircraft, flying boat, rocket and hovercraft company.
 Sandown is a popular seaside resort. It is home to the Isle of Wight Zoo, the Dinosaur Isle geological museum and one of the island's two 18-hole golf courses.
 Shanklin, just south of Sandown, attracts tourists with its high summer sunshine levels, sandy beaches, Shanklin Chine and the old village.
 Ventnor, built on the steep slopes of St Boniface Down on the south coast of the island, leads down to a picturesque bay that attracts many tourists. Ventnor Haven is a small harbour.

Economy

Socio-economic data
The table below shows the regional gross value (in millions of pounds) added by the Isle of Wight economy, at current prices, compiled by the Office for National Statistics.

According to the 2011 census, the island's population of 138,625 lives in 61,085 households, giving an average household size of 2.27 people.

41% of households own their home outright and a further 29% own with a mortgage, so in total 70% of households are owned (compared to 68% for South East England).

Compared to South East England, the island has fewer children (19% aged 0–17 compared to 22% for the South East) and more elderly (24% aged 65+ compared to 16% for the South East), giving an average age of 44 years for an island resident compared to 40 in South East England.

Industry and agriculture

The largest industry on the island is tourism, but it also has a significant agriculture  including sheep, dairy farming and arable crops. Traditional agricultural commodities are more difficult to market off the island because of transport costs, but local farmers have succeeded in exploiting some specialist markets, with the higher price of such products absorbing the transport costs. One of the most successful agricultural sectors is now the growing of crops under cover, particularly salad crops including tomatoes and cucumbers. The island has a warmer climate and a longer growing season than much of the United Kingdom. Garlic has been grown in Newchurch for many years, and is, in part, exported to France. This has led to the establishment of an annual Garlic Festival at Newchurch, which is one of the largest events of the local calendar. 

A favourable climate supports two vineyards, including one of the oldest in the British Isles at Adgestone. Lavender is grown for its oil. The largest agricultural sector has been dairying, but due to low milk prices and strict legislation for UK milk producers, the dairy industry has been in decline: there were nearly 150 producers in the mid-1980s, but now just 24.

Maritime industries, especially the making of sailcloth and boat building, have long been associated with the island, although this has diminished in recent years. GKN operates what began as the British Hovercraft Corporation, a subsidiary of (and known latterly as) Westland Aircraft, although they have reduced the extent of plant and workforce and sold the main site. Previously it had been the independent company Saunders-Roe, one of the island's most notable historic firms that produced many flying boats and the world's first hovercraft.

Another manufacturing activity is in composite materials, used by boat-builders and the wind turbine manufacturer Vestas, which has a wind turbine blade factory and testing facilities in West Medina Mills and East Cowes.

Bembridge Airfield is the home of Britten-Norman, manufacturers of the Islander and Trislander aircraft. This is shortly to become the site of the European assembly line for Cirrus light aircraft. The Norman Aeroplane Company is a smaller aircraft manufacturing company operating in Sandown. There have been three other firms that built planes on the island.

In 2005, Northern Petroleum began exploratory drilling for oil at its Sandhills-2 borehole at Porchfield, but ceased operations in October that year after failing to find significant reserves.

Breweries
There are three breweries on the island. Goddards Brewery in Ryde opened in 1993. David Yates, who was head brewer of the Island Brewery, started brewing as Yates Brewery at the Inn at St Lawrence in 2000. Ventnor Brewery, which closed in 2009, was the last incarnation of Burt's Brewery, brewing since the 1840s in Ventnor. Until the 1960s most pubs were owned by Mews Brewery, situated in Newport near the old railway station, but it closed and the pubs were taken over by Strong's, and then by Whitbread. By some accounts Mews beer was apt to be rather cloudy and dark. In the 19th century they pioneered the use of screw top cans for export to British India.

Services

Tourism and heritage

The island's heritage is a major asset that has for many years supported its tourist economy. Holidays focused on natural heritage, including wildlife and geology, are becoming an alternative to the traditional British seaside holiday, which went into decline in the second half of the 20th century due to the increased affordability of foreign holidays. The island is still an important destination for coach tours from other parts of the United Kingdom.

Tourism is still the largest industry, and most island towns and villages offer hotels, hostels and camping sites. In 1999, it hosted 2.7 million visitors, with 1.5 million staying overnight, and 1.2 million day visits; only 150,000 of these were from abroad. Between 1993 and 2000, visits increased at an average rate of 3% per year.

At the turn of the 19th century the island had ten pleasure piers, including two at Ryde and a "chain pier" at Seaview. The Victoria Pier in Cowes succeeded the earlier Royal Pier but was itself removed in 1960. The piers at Ryde, Seaview, Sandown, Shanklin and Ventnor originally served a coastal steamer service that operated from Southsea on the mainland. The piers at Seaview, Shanklin, Ventnor and Alum Bay were all destroyed by various storms during the 20th century; only the railway pier at Ryde and the piers at Sandown, Totland Bay (currently closed to the public) and Yarmouth survive.

Blackgang Chine is the oldest theme park in Britain, opened in 1843.  The skeleton of a dead whale that its founder Alexander Dabell found in 1844 is still on display.

As well as its more traditional attractions, the island is often host to walking or cycling holidays through the attractive scenery. An annual walking festival has attracted considerable interest. The  Isle of Wight Coastal Path follows the coastline as far as possible, deviating onto roads where the route along the coast is impassable.

The tourist board for the island is Visit Isle of Wight, a non-profit company. It is the Destination Management Organisation for the Isle of Wight, a public and private sector partnership led by the private sector, and consists of over 1,200 companies, including the ferry operators, the local bus company, rail operator and tourism providers working together to collectively promote the island. Its income is derived from the Wight BID, a business improvement district levy fund.

A major contributor to the local economy is sailing and marine-related tourism.

Summer Camp at Camp Beaumont is an attraction at the old Bembridge School site.

Media
The main local newspaper is the Isle of Wight County Press, published on most Fridays. The Island's leading news website, Island Echo, was launched in May 2012 and now publishes in excess of 5,000 news articles a year. Other online news sources for the Isle of Wight include On the Wight.

The island has a local commercial radio station and a community radio station: commercial station Isle of Wight Radio has broadcast in the medium-wave band since 1990 and on 107.0 MHz (with three smaller transmitters on 102.0 MHz) FM since 1998, as well as streaming on the Internet. Community station Vectis Radio has broadcast online since 2010, and in 2017 started broadcasting on FM 104.6. The station operates from the Riverside Centre in Newport. The island is also covered by a number of local stations on the mainland, including the BBC station BBC Radio Solent broadcast from Southampton. The island's not-for-profit community radio station Angel Radio opened in 2007. Angel Radio began broadcasting on 91.5 MHz from studios in Cowes and a transmitter near Newport.

The island has had community television stations in the past, first TV12 and then Solent TV from 2002 until its closure on 24 May 2007. iWight.tv is a local internet video news channel. The Isle of Wight is part of the BBC South region and the ITV Meridian region.

Important broadcasting infrastructure includes Chillerton Down transmitting station with a mast that is the tallest structure on the island, and Rowridge transmitting station, which broadcasts the main television signal both locally and for most of Hampshire and parts of Dorset and West Sussex.

Culture

Language and dialect
The local accent is similar to the traditional dialect of Hampshire, featuring the dropping of some consonants and an emphasis on longer vowels. It is similar to the West Country dialects heard in South West England, but less pronounced.

The island has its own local and regional words. Some, such as nipper/nips (a young male person), are still sometimes used and shared with neighbouring areas of the mainland. A few are unique to the island, for example overner and caulkhead (see below). Others are more obscure and now used mainly for comic emphasis, such as mallishag (meaning "caterpillar"), gurt meaning "large", nammit (a mid-morning snack) and gallybagger ("scarecrow", and now the name of a local cheese).
[[File:Bonchurch, near Ventnor, Isle of Wight.jpg|thumb|Henry Bates Joel's 1895 artwork 'Bonchurch, near Ventnor, Isle of Wight''' is a depiction of rural life on the island. It is exhibited in the Milntown Estate. ]]

Identity
There remains occasional confusion between the Isle of Wight as a county and its former position within Hampshire. The island was regarded and administered as a part of Hampshire until 1890, when its distinct identity was recognised with the formation of Isle of Wight County Council (see also Politics of the Isle of Wight). However, it remained a part of Hampshire until the local government reforms of 1974 when it became a full ceremonial county with its own Lord Lieutenant.

In January 2009, the first general flag for the county was accepted by the Flag Institute.

Island residents are sometimes referred to as "Vectensians", "Vectians" or, if born on the island, "caulkheads". One theory is that this last comes from the once prevalent local industry of caulking or sealing wooden boats; the term became attached to islanders either because they were so employed, or as a derisory term for perceived unintelligent labourers from elsewhere.  The term "overner" is used for island residents originating from the mainland (an abbreviated form of "overlander", which is an archaic term for "outsider" still found in parts of Australia).

Residents refer to the island as "The Island", as did Jane Austen in Mansfield Park, and sometimes to the UK mainland as "North Island".

To promote the island's identity and culture, the High Sheriff Robin Courage founded an Isle of Wight Day; the first was held on Saturday 24 September 2016.

Sport

Sport plays a key part of culture on the Isle of Wight. Sports include golf, marathon, cycling and sailing.

Music

The island is home to the Isle of Wight Festival and until 2016, Bestival before it was relocated to Lulworth Estate in Dorset. In 1970, the festival was headlined by Jimi Hendrix attracting an audience of 600,000, some six times the local population at the time. It is the home of the bands The Bees, Trixie's Big Red Motorbike, Level 42, and Wet Leg.

 Landmarks 

Transport

The Isle of Wight has  of roadway. It does not have a motorway, although there is a short stretch of dual carriageway towards the north of Newport near the hospital and prison.

A comprehensive bus network operated by Southern Vectis links most settlements, with Newport as its central hub.

Journeys away from the island involve a ferry journey. Car ferry and passenger catamaran services are run by Wightlink and Red Funnel, and a hovercraft passenger service (the only such remaining in the world) by Hovertravel.

The line was opened by the Isle of Wight Railway in 1864, and from 1996 to 2007 was run by the smallest train operating company on the network, Island Line Trains. It is notable for utilising old ex-London Underground rolling stock, due to the small size of its tunnels and unmodernised signalling.

There are two airfields for general aviation, Isle of Wight Airport at Sandown and Bembridge Airport.

The principal trails are:

 Prisons 
The Isle of Wight is near the densely populated south of England, yet separated from the mainland. This position led to it hosting three prisons: Albany, Camp Hill and Parkhurst, all located outside Newport near the main road to Cowes. Albany and Parkhurst were among the few Category A prisons in the UK until they were downgraded in the 1990s. The downgrading of Parkhurst was precipitated by a major escape: three prisoners (two murderers and a blackmailer) escaped from the prison on 3 January 1995 for four days, before being recaptured. Parkhurst enjoyed notoriety as one of the toughest jails in the United Kingdom, and housed many notable inmates including the Yorkshire Ripper Peter Sutcliffe, New Zealand drug lord Terry Clark and the Kray twins.

Camp Hill is located adjacent but to the west of Albany and Parkhurst, on the very edge of Parkhurst Forest, having been converted first to a borstal and later to a Category C prison. It was built on the site of an army camp (both Albany and Parkhurst were barracks); there is a small estate of tree-lined roads with the former officers' quarters (now privately owned) to the south and east. Camp Hill closed as a prison in March 2013.

The management of all three prisons was merged into a single administration, under HMP Isle of Wight in April 2009.

Education

There are 69 local education authority-maintained schools on the Isle of Wight, and two independent schools. As a rural community, many of these are small and with fewer pupils than in urban areas. The Isle of Wight College is located on the outskirts of Newport.

From September 2010, there was a transition period from the three-tier system of primary, middle and high schools to the two-tier system that is usual in England. Some schools have now closed, such as Chale C.E. Primary. Others have become "federated", such as Brading C.E. Primary and St Helen's Primary. Christ the King College started as two "middle schools", Trinity Middle School and Archbishop King Catholic Middle School, but has now been converted into a dual-faith secondary school and sixth form.

Since September 2011 five new secondary schools, with an age range of 11 to 18 years, replaced the island's high schools (as a part of the previous three-tier system).

Notable people

Notable residents have included:

17th century and earlier

 King Arwald, last pagan king in England
 King Charles I of England, who was imprisoned at Carisbrooke Castle
 Earl Tostig Godwinson, who supported Norwegian king Harald Hardrada's invasion
 Actor, highwayman and conspirator Cardell "Scum" Goodman
 Soldier and regicide of Charles I Thomas Harrison, imprisoned at Carisbrooke with John Rogers and Christopher Feake
 Soldier Peter de Heyno
 Philosopher and polymath Robert Hooke
 Murderer Michal Morey

18th century

 Marine painter Thomas Buttersworth
 Explorer Anthony Henday
 Radical journalist John Wilkes

19th century

 Queen Victoria and Prince Albert (monarch and consort), who built and lived at Osborne House
 Photographer Julia Margaret Cameron, who lived at Dimbola Lodge
 Irish Republican Thomas Clarke
 Naval captain Jeremiah Coghlan, who retired to Ryde
 Writer Charles Dickens
 Novelist Gertrude Fenton
 Poet John Keats
 Inventor and radio pioneer Guglielmo Marconi
 Philosopher Karl Marx, who stayed at 1, St. Boniface Gardens, Ventnor
 Poet and hymnwriter Albert Midlane
 Geologist and engineer John Milne
 Regency architect John Nash
 Novelist Harriet Parr
 Early Hong Kong Government administrator William Pedder
 New Zealand PM Henry Sewell
 Poet Algernon Charles Swinburne
 Poet Alfred Tennyson

20th century onwards

 Scriptwriter Raymond Allen
 Concert organist E. Power Biggs
 Darts player Keegan Brown
 Singer Helen Clare
 Singer-songwriter Sarah Close
 Inventor of the hovercraft Sir Christopher Cockerell
 Presenter and actor Ray Cokes
 Actress Bella Emberg
 Yachtsman Uffa Fox
 Actor Marius Goring
 Musician Jack Green
 Survival expert and Chief Scout Bear Grylls
 Actress Sheila Hancock
 Actor Melvyn Hayes
 Singer-songwriter Lauran Hibberd
 Folk-rock musician Robyn Hitchcock
 Actor Geoffrey Hughes
 Conspiracy theorist David Icke
 Actor Jeremy Irons
 Comedian Phill Jupitus
 Actor Laura Michelle Kelly
 Composer Albert Ketèlbey
 Iranian poet Mimi Khalvati
 Musician Mark King
 Band Level 42
 Yachtswoman Ellen MacArthur
 BBC Tonight presenter Cliff Michelmore
 Film director Anthony Minghella
 Actor David Niven
 Cyclist Kieran Page
 Professor of biochemistry Samuel Victor Perry
 Musician Frederick Riddle
 Performance artist Nigel Rolfe
 Heptathlete Kelly Sotherton
 Gardener and presenter Alan Titchmarsh
 Novelist Edward Upward
 Band Wet Leg

Overseas names
The Isle of Wight has given names to many parts of former colonies, most notably Isle of Wight County in Virginia founded by settlers from the island in the 17th century. Its county seat is a town named Isle of Wight.

Other notable examples include:
 Isle of Wight – an island off Maryland, United States
 Dunnose Head, West Falkland
 Ventnor, Cowes on Phillip Island, Victoria, Australia
 Carisbrook, Victoria, Australia
 Carisbrook, a former stadium in Dunedin, New Zealand
 Ryde, New South Wales, Australia
 Shanklin, Sandown, New Hampshire, United States
 Ventnor City, New Jersey, United States
 Gardiners Island, New York, United States shown as "Isle of Wight" on some of the older maps.

Cultural references
Film
 The film Something to Hide (1972; US title  Shattered), starring Peter Finch, was filmed near Cowes.
 The British film That'll Be the Day (1973), starring David Essex and Ringo Starr, included scenes shot in Ryde (notably Cross Street), Sandown (school), Shanklin (beach) and Wootton Bridge (fairground).
 Mrs. Brown (1997), with Dame Judi Dench and Billy Connolly, was filmed at Osborne House and Chale.
 The film Fragile (2005), starring Calista Flockhart, is based on the Isle of Wight.
 Victoria and Abdul (2017) starring Dame Judi Dench and Ali Fazal began shooting principal photography at Osborne House in September 2016.

Games
 John Worsley's Commodore 64 game Spirit of the Stones was set on the Isle of Wight.

Literature

The Isle of Wight was:

Music
 The Beatles' song "When I'm Sixty-Four" (1967), credited to Lennon-McCartney and sung by Paul McCartney, refers to renting a cottage on the island;

Television
 Survivors, the BBC's 1970s post-apocalyptic sci-fi drama set after a worldwide pandemic kills off most of humanity, features an episode in which 500 survivors holed up in London are to be relocated to the Isle of Wight. Though referred to many times in the Series 2 episode "Lights of London – Part 2", the move itself is not shown (nor any footage of the island).
 ITV's dramatisation of Dennis Potter's work Blade on the Feather (19 October 1980) was filmed on the island.
 A 2002 Top Gear feature showed an Aston Martin being driven around Cowes, East Cowes, and along the Military Road and seawall at Freshwater Bay.
 The setting for Free Rein was based on the Isle of Wight.
 Portions of the 2021 drama series It's a Sin on Channel 4 were supposedly set in the Isle of Wight, the home of one of the lead characters, although they were actually filmed in Rhos-on-Sea and Bangor in north Wales.
 The sitcom The Cockfields'' is set on the Isle of Wight.

See also

 High Sheriff of the Isle of Wight
 Isle of Wight gasification facility
 Isle of Wight NHS Trust
 Isle of Wight Rifles
 List of civil parishes on the Isle of Wight
 List of current places of worship on the Isle of Wight
 List of Governors of the Isle of Wight
 List of hills of the Isle of Wight
 List of places on the Isle of Wight
 Lord Lieutenant of the Isle of Wight
 Yaverland Battery

Notes

References

Sources

Books

External links

 Visit Isle of Wight Official Website
 Isle of Wight Council website
 Isleofwight.com
 

 
Islands of England
Islands of the English Channel
Isle of Wight
Natural regions of England
Isle of Wight
South East England
Isle of Wight
Isle of Wight